José Eleazar López Contreras (5 May 1883 – 2 January 1973) was the president of Venezuela between 1935 and 1941. He was an army general and one of Juan Vicente Gómez's collaborators, serving as his War Minister from 1931. In 1939, López Contreras accepted on behalf of Venezuela the ships Koenigstein and Caribia
which had fled with Jews from Germany.

López Contreras cabinet (1935–41)

Personal life
Eleazar López Contreras was married to María Teresa Núñez Tovar, who served as First Lady of Venezuela from 1936–1941.

See also 
  
Presidents of Venezuela
List of Venezuelans

References 
  General Eleazar López Contreras — Official biography.

Presidents of Venezuela
Venezuelan generals
Venezuelan soldiers
Venezuelan life senators
Venezuelan people of Spanish descent
Recipients of the Legion of Honour
1883 births
1973 deaths